The Nantong–Suzhou–Jiaxing–Ningbo high-speed railway or Tongsujiayong railway ("Tong", "Su", "Jia" and "Yong" being the abbreviations for Nantong, Suzhou, Jiaxing and Ningbo, respectively) is a high-speed railway line between Nantong and Ningbo in China. It is expected to open in 2027.

The railway is expected to reduce the journey time from Ningbo to Suzhou and Shanghai to around one hour.

History
In October 2020, geological surveys began in preparation for the construction of a bridge across Hangzhou Bay which will carry the railway.

Construction on the railway started on 30 November 2022.

Route
The line takes new north–south route which bypasses Shanghai, instead heading via Suzhou, Jiaxing, and Cixi. The line crosses the Yangtze River via two tracks of the four-track Hutong Yangtze River Bridge. The other two tracks carry the Nantong–Shanghai railway.

It is however not the first railway to travel between Suzhou and Jiaxing. The Suzhou–Jiaxing railway operated from the 1930s to 1944.

References

High-speed railway lines in China
High-speed railway lines under construction